Dr. Ambedkar Memorial Institute of Information Technology and Management Science or (DAMITS) is a business school located in Jagda of city Rourkela. DAMITS was established in the year 2001 under Dr. Ambedkar Memorial Social, Welfare & Educational Trust. The Institute is affiliated to AICTE, Sambalpur University and Biju Patnaik University of Technology. The Institute offers three years regular course on undergraduate degree of BBA and BCA with two years regular course on postgraduate degree of MBA and MCA.

References

Business schools in Odisha
Colleges affiliated with Biju Patnaik University of Technology
Universities and colleges in Rourkela
Educational institutions established in 2001
2001 establishments in Orissa
Colleges affiliated to Sambalpur University